Wally, Walt, or Walter Miller may refer to:

Film and television
Walt Miller, a character in the TV series New Girl
Walter Miller (actor) (1892–1940), American film actor
Walter C. Miller (1926–2020), American television director and producer

Politicians
Walter Dale Miller (1925–2015), American politician
Walter L. Miller (politician) (1830–?), New Brunswick-born Wisconsin politician

Sportspeople
Wally Miller (1917–1992), Australian footballer
Walt Miller (basketball) (1915–2001), American basketball player
Walt Miller (baseball) (1883–1956), American baseball pitcher
Walter Miller (American football), American football coach in the United States
Walter Miller (footballer) (1882–1928), English footballer
Walter Miller (ice hockey) (1887–1959), Canadian ice hockey player
Walter Miller (jockey) (1890–1959), American Hall of Fame jockey
Walter Miller (rugby league), rugby league footballer of the 1910s for New Zealand, and Wellington
Walter Miller (wrestler), Australian middleweight wrestling champion
Jake Miller (pitcher) (Walter Miller, 1898–1975), American baseball pitcher

Other
Walter Miller (philologist) (1864–1949), American classical linguistics scholar
Walter B. Miller (1920–2004), American anthropologist
Walter James Miller (1918–2010), American literary critic, playwright, poet, and translator
Walter L. Miller (endocrinologist), American endocrinologist and professor of pediatrics
Walter Lee Miller Jr., United States Marine Corps officer
Walter M. Miller Jr. (1923–1996), American science fiction author

See also
Walter Millar, unionist politician in Northern Ireland